Cloverdale is an unincorporated community in Wood County, Ohio, United States and is part of Portage Township and located at the intersection of Cloverdale and Kramer roads.

History
A post office called Cloverdale was established in 1892, and remained in operation until 1904. Besides the post office, Cloverdale had a church building.

Notes

Unincorporated communities in Wood County, Ohio
Unincorporated communities in Ohio